Carlsson is a German car tuning manufacturer specialising in Mercedes-Benz cars. The Carlsson tuning house was founded by brothers Rolf and Andreas Hartge in 1989. Carlsson's products are available for the entire current range of Mercedes-Benz models including the R-Class , SL-Class , C-Class  and the GL-Class  along with many others. The company is most popular for its range of alloy wheels.

Through a new importer Carlsson began a more aggressive push into the US market in 2006 after debuting their newly modified CL500 (Euro-spec) vehicle at the 2006 SEMA Show. In their review, Modified Luxury & Exotics magazine said, "... the CL is starting to resemble something more in line with a Bentley Continental - even if it is a little shy when it comes to horsepower."

History 

The brothers, Rolf and Andreas Hartge, started a company in 1989 named Carlsson in honor of the Swedish rally driver, Ingvar Carlsson, who raced for the Mercedes Rally Team during the 1980s.

Carlsson also made cars based on Citroën, SAAB, Toyota, Lexus, Hyundai, and Genesis models.

In 2012, Zhongsheng Group Holdings Limited acquired 70% of the company's stake.

In 2015, Sambo Motors Co. Ltd., a Korean company, took over with effect from December 4.

Cars

Carlsson CK35 RS Race Car
Based on a Mercedes SLK350 the CK35 RS race car debuted at the Nürburgring 24 hour race in 2005. It can sprint from 0 to 100 km/h (62 mph) in 4.8 seconds and reaches a top speed of 265 km/h (165 mph).

Carlsson C25
Carlsson's first supercar, the C25, made its debut at the 2010 Geneva Motor Show. Estimated acceleration from 0–100 km/h (62 mph) in 3.7 seconds and top speed is 219 mph. (355 km/h)

Carlsson C38

The Carlsson C38 was produced in 1998 in very limited numbers as it was incredibly expensive when new. Based on the 208 CLK320 with the Carlsson CM38 upgraded engine (hand built 3.8V6), strengthened chassis, braking system, exhaust, suspension, 18 inch three piece alloy wheels 9.5 (front) 11.5(rear), wide body and speedometer cluster. The C38 is seldom seen for sale and very sought after by collectors.

Carlsson Coachbuilding

In 2007, Carlsson began a coachbuilding program with fashionhouse Etienne Aigner. The first example of their work together was a coachbuilt Mercedes CL65, titled the Carlsson Aigner CK65 RS "Eau Rouge." The "Eau Rouge" refers to the famous turn at the Belgian race track Spa Francorchamps. Producing  from Carlsson's engineers the car has a two-tone paint scheme and features a hand crafted wine-colored interior from Etienne Aigner.

References

External links
Carlsson Official Homepage
Article on Carlsson Aigner CK65 RS "Eau Rouge"
Carlsson Asia Pacific Pte. Ltd.

Mercedes-Benz
Automotive companies of Germany
Automotive motorsports and performance companies
Companies based in Saarland